Plješivica or Plješevica, also called Lička Plješevica (i.e., "Plješevica of Lika"), is a mountain in Croatia and on the border with Bosnia and Herzegovina, part of the Dinaric Alps. It stretches in the direction north–south, and it extends from the mountain pass that separates it from Mala Kapela, along the Krbava field to the west and the Una River canyon to the east, and ending near Gračac where it touches on Velebit.

Željava Air Base is located inside Plješevica, the largest underground airbase in SFR Yugoslavia.

The highest peaks:
 Ozeblin at 1,657 meters, in the central part of the mount
 Gornja Plješevica at 1,649 meters, located in the northern part
 Plješevički Kabao at 1,618 meters, in the north-central region

There are additional peaks that extend from Plješevica, notably Kremen at 1591 meters in the south and Mrsin at 1,269 meters in the north.

References

Mountains of Croatia
Lika
Bosnia and Herzegovina–Croatia border
Mountains of Bosnia and Herzegovina
International mountains of Europe